Hamiora Wiremu Maioha, OBE (21 September 1888 – 30 January 1963) was a New Zealand  interpreter, farmer and community leader. Of Māori descent, he identified with the Ngāpuhi iwi. He was born in Waimamaku, Northland, New Zealand, on 21 September 1888.

In the 1963 New Year Honours, Maioha was appointed an Officer of the Order of the British Empire, for services to the Māori people.

References

1888 births
1963 deaths
New Zealand farmers
Interpreters
Ngāpuhi people
New Zealand Māori farmers
New Zealand Officers of the Order of the British Empire
20th-century translators